Taylor Brantley McNeel (born 1983) is a United States district judge of the United States District Court for the Southern District of Mississippi.

Education 

McNeel earned his Bachelor of Business Administration, cum laude, from the University of Mississippi, and his Juris Doctor, cum laude, from the University of Mississippi School of Law, where he served on the Mississippi Law Journal.

Career 

From 2008 to 2020, he was a member at Brunini, Grantham, Grower & Hewes, PLLC, in Biloxi, Mississippi, where his practice focused on complex commercial litigation. He was the Partner in Charge of the Mississippi Gulf Coast office. He has been a member of the Federalist Society since 2020.

Federal judicial service 

On June 15, 2020, President Donald Trump announced his intent to nominate McNeel to serve as a United States district judge of the United States District Court for the Southern District of Mississippi. On July 2, 2020, his nomination was sent to the Senate. President Trump nominated McNeel to the seat vacated by Judge Louis Guirola Jr., who assumed senior status on March 23, 2018. On September 9, 2020, a hearing on his nomination was held before the Senate Judiciary Committee. On October 22, 2020, the Judiciary Committee reported his nomination by a 12–0 vote. On November 30, 2020, the United States Senate invoked cloture on his nomination by a 52–36 vote. On December 1, 2020, his nomination was confirmed by a 53–39 vote. He received his judicial commission on December 14, 2020.

References

External links 
 

1983 births
Living people
21st-century American lawyers
21st-century American judges
Federalist Society members
Judges of the United States District Court for the Southern District of Mississippi
Mississippi lawyers
People from Louisville, Mississippi
United States district court judges appointed by Donald Trump
University of Mississippi alumni
University of Mississippi School of Law alumni